A Midsummer's Nightmare (1996) is a novel by Garry Kilworth. It is a comical parody of William Shakespeare's A Midsummer Night's Dream, and is internally illustrated by Stephen Player.

Oberon, King of the Fairies, decides to relocate his people from Sherwood Forest, increasingly littered by tourists and drained of magic, to the less-spoiled New Forest. Aided by young car mechanic Sid whom the fairies have captured, they set off in an old bus that Sid teaches Queen Titania to drive, and have various encounters with humans on the way. At a village fête, Titania falls in love with and abducts a human baby (a humorous contrast to A Midsummer Night's Dream where she falls in love with a half-man/half-donkey) whose disappearance attracts pursuit, and the fairy band joins up with a convoy of Stonehenge-bound New-age travellers, including would-be writer Tom Blessing who bears some resemblance to the book's author.

However, the fairies' passage through the land awakens other supernatural entities, including Wotan, Gogmagog, the Green Man, the Long Man of Wilmington, and Titania's old foe Morgan-le-Fay, the Morning-Fairy. She, compelling the aid of various legendary beings, proposes to restore the polluted modern world by returning it to the era of Avalon, but with herself in charge, and to raise the necessary magical power by sacrificing the stolen baby, whose ancestry traces back to the Matter of Britain. Sid and Tom help to thwart Morgan's machinations, Sid manages to return the baby, and at the book's climax, Morgan and Titania engage in a magical duel to the death.

1996 British novels
Parody novels
Novels based on A Midsummer Night's Dream
Novels set in Nottinghamshire
Bantam Press books